Alen Orman (born 31 May 1978) is a naturalized Austrian football player who represented the Austria national football team once.

Club career
Orman, who is a wing-back, has previously played for Antwerp, Thun, Hibernian and Dynamo Dresden before moving to Altach in summer 2007.

Signed by Hibernian in 2001, Orman had an epileptic seizure during a Scottish League Cup tie against Rangers in October 2002. Another seizure prevented him from playing in a league match against Motherwell in May 2003.

International career
He made one appearance for Austria, in a November 2002 friendly match against Norway.

Statistics

References

External links

Profile at VI.nl 

1978 births
Living people
People from Bugojno
Association football fullbacks
Association football wingers
Austrian footballers
Austria international footballers
Austrian expatriate footballers
FC Admira Wacker Mödling players
Royal Antwerp F.C. players
Hibernian F.C. players
FC Thun players
Dynamo Dresden players
SC Rheindorf Altach players
Austrian Football Bundesliga players
Scottish Premier League players
Belgian Pro League players
Expatriate footballers in Belgium
Expatriate footballers in Scotland
Expatriate footballers in Switzerland
Expatriate footballers in Germany
Bosnia and Herzegovina emigrants to Austria
Austrian expatriate sportspeople in Belgium
Austrian expatriate sportspeople in Switzerland
Austrian expatriate sportspeople in Scotland
Austrian expatriate sportspeople in Germany
Naturalised citizens of Austria